Sonny Mignacca (born January 4, 1974) is a Canadian retired professional ice hockey goaltender.

Playing career
Mignacca played major junior with the Medicine Hat Tigers of the Western Hockey League, beginning in 1990–91.  In 1993–94, he was awarded the Four Broncos Memorial Trophy as league MVP after posting a 3.27 GAA and a 26-23-5 record.  Mignacca was drafted two years prior by the Vancouver Canucks 213th overall in the 1992 NHL Entry Draft.

After graduating from major junior, Mignacca was assigned to the Syracuse Crunch of the American Hockey League, the Canucks' minor league affiliate.  Two years later, he joined the Tallahassee Tiger Sharks of the East Coast Hockey League.  He spent one season in Tallahassee before going overseas to play in the British Ice Hockey Superleague for two seasons.  Mignacca returned to North America and played one last season in the Western Professional Hockey League with the Tupelo T-Rex before retiring from professional hockey.

Awards
Awarded the Four Broncos Memorial Trophy as WHL MVP in 1994
 WHL East Second All-Star Team – 1992 & 1994

Career statistics

Regular season and playoffs

External links
 

Vancouver Canucks draft picks
Canadian ice hockey goaltenders
Medicine Hat Tigers players
Living people
1974 births